The 457th Airlift Squadron (457 AS) was part of the 375th Air Mobility Wing and was stationed at Andrews Air Force Base, Maryland.  It operated C-21 aircraft providing executive airlift.

History
Established in mid-1942 under II Bomber Command as a B-17 Flying Fortress Replacement Training Unit (RTU).  Operated until March 1944 with the end of Heavy Bomber training.

B-29 Superfortress operations against Japan
Re-designated on 1 April 1944 as a B-29 Superfortress Very Heavy bombardment squadron.  When training was completed moved to North Field Guam in the Mariana Islands of the Central Pacific Area in January 1945 and assigned to XXI Bomber Command, Twentieth Air Force. Its mission was the strategic bombardment of the Japanese Home Islands and the destruction of its war-making capability.

Flew "shakedown" missions against Japanese targets on Moen Island, Truk, and other points in the Carolines and Marianas.  The squadron began combat missions over Japan on 25 February 1945 with a firebombing mission over Northeast Tokyo.  The squadron continued to participate in wide area firebombing attack, but the first ten-day blitz resulting in the Army Air Forces running out of incendiary bombs. Until then the squadron flew conventional strategic bombing missions using high explosive bombs.

The squadron continued attacking urban areas with incendiary raids until the end of the war in August 1945, attacking major Japanese cities, causing massive destruction of urbanized areas.  Also conducted raids against strategic objectives, bombing aircraft factories, chemical plants, oil refineries, and other targets in Japan. The squadron flew its last combat missions on 14 August when hostilities ended.  Afterwards, its B 29s carried relief supplies to Allied prisoner of war camps in Japan and Manchuria.

Squadron remained in Western Pacific, although largely demobilized in the fall of 1945.   Some aircraft scrapped on Tinian; others flown to storage depots in the United States. Inactivated as part of Army Service forces at the end of 1945.

United States Air Force
Reactivated as a reserve B-29 squadron at March AFB, California in 1949.  Squadron personnel were activated for Korean War service on 1 May 1951 and reassigned to active duty units and deployed to Far East Air Forces.   Inactivated as a paper unit in June 1951.   Reactivated as a C-46 Commando Troop Carrier Squadron in June 1952, but unclear whether manned or equipped.  Inactivated in July 1952.

Reactivated during the Vietnam War at Cam Ranh Air Base, South Vietnam in 1966.  Provided intratheater airlift in Vietnam, including airland and airdrop assault missions from, 1966–1972, being inactivated as part of the drawdown of United States forces and the closure of Cam Ranh AB.

The squadron conducted pilot readiness training from, 1975–1984 and administrative airlift from, 1975–1993.  It supported intratheater airlift in Southwest Asia, August 1990 – April 1991.  It has provided airlift support for high-ranking dignitaries of the US and foreign governments from 1993 until 2019.

The squadron was inactivated on 14 June 2019.

Operations and decorations
 Combat Operations:  Conducted bombardment missions against Japan, c. 6 Apr-14 August 1945; Intratheater airlift in Southeast Asia, including airland and airdrop assault missions, 1967–1972
 Campaigns: World War II: Western Pacific; Air Offensive, Japan; Vietnam Air Offensive; Vietnam Air Offensive, Phase II; Vietnam Air/Ground 1968; Vietnam Air Offensive, Phase III; Vietnam Air Offensive, Phase IV; TET 69/ Counteroffensive; Vietnam Summer-Fall 1969; Vietnam Winter-Spring 1970; Sanctuary Counteroffensive; Southwest Monsoon; Commando Hunt V; Commando Hunt VI; Commando Hunt VII; Intratheater airlift in Southwest Asia, August 1990 – April 1991;
 Decorations: Distinguished Unit Citations:   Japan, 10 May 1945; Tokyo and Yokohama, Japan, 23–29 May 1945.  Presidential Unit Citations (Southeast Asia) 21 Jan-12 May 1968; 1 Apr-30 June 1970; Navy Presidential Unit Citation: Vietnam, 20 Jan-1 April 1968; Air Force Outstanding Unit Award with Combat "V" Device 1 Jan-30 April 1967; 1 May 1967 – 30 April 1968; 1 July 1970 – 31 December 1971. Republic of Vietnam Gallantry Cross with Palm: 1 January 1967 – 30 April 1972; Air Force Outstanding Unit Awards-1 Jul-31 December 1975; 1 January 1976 – 31 January 1977; 1 June 1981 – 31 May 1982; 1 June 1982 – 30 June 1983; 1 June 1986 – 31 July 1988

Lineage
 Constituted 459th Bombardment Squadron (Heavy) on 1 July 1942
 Activated on 6 July 1942
 Inactivated on 1 April 1944
 Redesignated 459th Bombardment Squadron (Very Heavy) and activated on 1 April 1944
 Inactivated on 27 December 1945
 Redesignated 459th Bombardment Squadron (Medium) and activated in the reserve on 27 June 1949
 Ordered to active duty on 1 May 1951
 Inactivated on 16 June 1951
 Redesignated 459th Troop Carrier Squadron (Medium) on 26 May 1952
 Activated in the reserve on 14 June 1952
 Inactivated on 14 July 1952.
 Redesignated 457th Troop Carrier Squadron and activated on 12 October 1966
 Inactivated on 30 April 1972
 Consolidated (1 December 1991) with the 1402d Military Airlift Squadron, which was designated, and activated, on 1 April 1975.
 Redesignated 457th Airlift Squadron on 1 December 1991.
 Inactivated on 9 August 2019

Assignments
 330th Bombardment Group, 6 July 1952 – 1 April 1944; 1 April 1944 – 27 December 1945; 27 June 1949 – 16 June 1951
 330th Troop Carrier Group, 14 Jun-14 July 1952
 Pacific Air Forces, 12 October 1966
 483rd Troop Carrier (later Tactical Airlift, later Composite) Wing, 1 January 1967 – 1 March 1972
 89th Military Airlift Wing, 1 April 1975
 375th Aeromedical (later 375th Military Airlift) Wing, 15 March 1978
 89th Operations Group, 1 December 1991 – unknown
 375th Operations Group, unknown – 9 August 2019

Bases stationed

 Salt Lake City Army Air Base, Utah, 6 July 1942
 Alamogordo Army Air Field, New Mexico, 1 August 1942
 Biggs Field, Texas, 2 September 1942
 Alamogordo Army Air Field, New Mexico, 29 November 1942
 Biggs Field, Texas, 5 April 1943 – 1 April 1944
 Walker Army Airfield, Kansas, 1 April 1944
 Dalhart Army Air Field, Texas, 25 May 1944
 Walker Army Airfield, Kansas, 1 August 1944 – 7 January 1945

 North Field, Guam, Northern Mariana Islands, 18 Feb-19 November 1945
 Camp Anza, California, c. 18–27 December 1945
 March AFB, California, 27 June 1949 – 16 June 1951
 Greater Pittsburgh Airport, Pennsylvania, 14 June-14 July 1952
 Cam Ranh Air Base, South Vietnam, 1 January 1966 – 30 April 1972
 Detachment at Don Muang Airport, Thailand
 Andrews AFB, Maryland, 1 April 1975 – 9 August 2019

Aircraft operated

B-17 Flying Fortress (1942, 1944)
B-24 Liberator (1942–1944)
B-29 Superfortress (1944–1945, 1949–1951)
C-7 Caribou (1967–1972)

T-39 Sabreliner (1975–1984)
VC-131 (1975–1977)
C-12 Huron (1976–1977, 1984–1994)
C-21 (1984–2019)

Operations
World War II
Vietnam War
Operation Desert Shield

References

 
USAF 457th Airlift Squadron History

External links

Military units and formations in Maryland
457